The 26th Connecticut Infantry Regiment was an infantry regiment that served in the Union Army during the American Civil War for nine months service.

Service
The 26th Connecticut Infantry Regiment was organized at Norwich, Connecticut, on November 10, 1862.

The regiment was attached to Sherman's Division, Department of the Gulf, to January 1863. 1st Brigade, 2nd Division, XIX Corps, Department of the Gulf, to August 1863.

The 26th Connecticut Infantry mustered out of service August 17, 1863.

Detailed service
Left Connecticut for eastern New York November 12, then sailed for Ship Island and New Orleans, Louisiana, November 29, arriving there December 16. Duty at Camp Parapet until May 1863. Moved to Springfield Landing May 20. Siege of Port Hudson May 24-July 9. Assaults on Port Hudson May 27 and June 14. Surrender of Port Hudson July 9.

Casualties
The regiment lost a total of 145 men during service; 4 officers and 51 enlisted men killed or mortally wounded, 1 officer and 89 enlisted men died of disease.

Commanders
 Colonel Thomas G. Kingsley - Wounded May 27, 1863 during the first assault at Port Hudson.
 Lieutenant Colonel Joseph Selden - commanded during the siege of Port Hudson

See also

 Connecticut in the American Civil War
 List of Connecticut Civil War units

References

 Alexander, Walter S. Sermon Occasioned by the Death of Edwin Ruthven Keyes, Sergeant in the 26th Conn. Regiment, Who Was Wounded at Port Hudson, May 27th, 1863, and Who Died at Baton Rouge, La., June 12th, 1863 (Danielsonville, CT: Transcript Print.), 1863.
 Association of the Twenty-Sixth Regiment, Connecticut Volunteers. Roster, Muster Roll and Chronological Record of the Twenty-Sixth Regiment, Connecticut Volunteers and Memoranda of the Association of the Twenty-Sixth Regiment, Connecticut Volunteers (Norwich, CT: F. Utley), 1888.
 Dyer, Frederick H. A Compendium of the War of the Rebellion (Des Moines, IA: Dyer Pub. Co.), 1908.
 Fellows, William C. Dear Mother and Sister: The Civil War Letters of Pvt. William C. Fellows, 26th Regt., Conn. Volunteers, Company K (Old Mystic, CT: The Indian and Colonial Research Center), 2009. 
 Memoranda Twenty-Sixth Regiment, Conn. Vols. (S.l.: s.n.), 1887.
 Smith, Stephen. Record of Service of Connecticut Men in the Army and Navy of the United States During the War of the Rebellion (Hartford, CT: The Case, Lockwood & Brainard Company), 1889.
Attribution

External links
 26th Connecticut Infantry monument in Norwich, Connecticut

Military units and formations established in 1862
Military units and formations disestablished in 1863
26th Connecticut Infantry Regiment
1862 establishments in Connecticut